Camusat is a French surname. Notable people with the surname include:

 Denis-François Camusat (1697–1732), French historian, grand nephew of Nicholas Camusat
 Nicholas Camusat (1575–1655), French historian
 Léonie Rouzade  born Louise-Léonie Camusat

French-language surnames